Sugar sand may refer to:

 Sugar sand, the organic salt debris that settles to the bottom of a container of maple sap once it has reached a sugar concentration of 66-67%.
 Sugar sand, the local name for a type of fine sandy soil found in the Pine Barrens of South Jersey in the U.S. state of New Jersey.
 Sugar sand, a soil type that is a component of traditional baseball rubbing mud, eroded from the Pine Barrens, used by Major League Baseball as an abrasive to condition new baseballs.
 Sugar sand, a type of granular calcite found as an identifying marker bed in the Pfeifer shale member of the Greenhorn Limestone in Ellis, Ness, Hodgeman, and other Kansas counties.
 Sugar Sand Park, a municipal park in Boca Raton, Florida.

References 

Sand
Set index articles